Burg Pürnstein is a castle in Upper Austria, Austria.

See also
List of castles in Austria

References

This article was initially translated from the German Wikipedia.

Castles in Upper Austria
History of Upper Austria